The Alii nui were high chiefs of the four main Hawaiian Islands. The rulers of Molokai, like those of the other Hawaiian islands, claimed descent from god Wākea.

The traditional history of Molokai is fragmentary. The island was not of major political importance. Its importance lay in the connections its royal family made by marriage, and, in later years, the reputation of its sorcery and kahunas. Molokai is the fifth largest of the eight main Hawaiian isles, and its size hindered it in its struggle for power and survival among the other islands of Maui, Oahu, Kauai and Hawaii.

By the end of the 17th century, as interisland conflict grew worse and worse, Molokai suffered many blows from the powerful monarchs of other isles; notably Kapiiohookalani, Peleioholani and Kahekili II. Molokai finally, and completely, succumbed to the might of Maui prior to the end of the ancient Hawaiian era.

List of Alii of Molokaʻi
Kamauaua
Keʻoloʻewa
Kapau-a-Nuʻakea 
Kamauliwahine 
Hualani 
some number of generations
Kahokuohua
some number of generations
Kalanipehu
some number of generations
Kanealai

References

Lists of monarchs
Native Hawaiian people
Lists of people from Hawaii
Hawaiian chiefs
Polynesian titles